Patrick Vial (born 1946 in Paris) is a French judoka and Olympic medalist. He won a bronze medal at the 1976 Summer Olympics in Montreal.

References

1946 births
Living people
Sportspeople from Paris
French male judoka
Olympic judoka of France
Judoka at the 1972 Summer Olympics
Judoka at the 1976 Summer Olympics
Olympic bronze medalists for France
Olympic medalists in judo
Medalists at the 1976 Summer Olympics
20th-century French people